Alcadozo is a municipality in Albacete, Castile-La Mancha, Spain. It has a population of 759.

References

Municipalities of the Province of Albacete